The Concourse is a cultural center in the North Shore suburb of Chatswood, which is a 20-minute journey from the Sydney Central Business District. In 2007 the City of Willoughby commissioned new designs to replace the old Chatswood Civic Centre.

The first Willoughby Town Hall was built on the site in 1903. The hall doubled as the Council Chambers and the site was shared with the Council Pound, the School of Arts, and the Ku-ring-gai Masonic Lodge. A three-story administration building was also built on the site in 1967 (with a fourth floor added in 1980).

In 1972, the original Town Hall was demolished and replaced by a new Civic Centre, comprising the Town Hall which seated 850 people, and the smaller Bailey Hall, which seated 350. This building played an essential part in Willoughby City's community and culture for many years.

The new cultural complex was designed by Francis-Jones Morehen Thorp architects. Following demolition of the old buildings, construction began on The Concourse in July 2008 at a cost of approximately $162 million and was complete in July 2011. The complex was officially opened on 17 September 2011 by the Governor of NSW, Marie Bashir.

In addition to a 5,000  library, The Concourse at Chatswood features a large public open space, a 500-seat theatre, rehearsal spaces, a 1,000-seat concert hall, cafés, retail and commercial outlets, a boutique hotel, and a multi-purpose exhibition hall. The Concourse also includes car parking over two entire basement levels and a 5,000  stormwater detention tank as part of an integrated water management system. Within the ground floor of The Concourse a gallery known as The Art Space has been installed, this is a community 92  space and features weekly art exhibitions from local artists and art collectives. It is equipped with professional track lighting and hanging systems.

For the Chatswood Library, where reading light for eyes of all ages was a central issue, lighting specialists Klik Systems were enlisted to design & construct energy-efficient beam luminaires. Klik Systems also contributed lighting to the new Canberra Airport and to the interactive digital art façade called Luminous at Darling Quarter Sydney. The Chatswood library occupies 5,000m2 on the lower ground level, entered via the main podium.

Patrons
Patrons of The Concourse include leading figures in Australia's arts industries including soprano Yvonne Kenny, poet Les Murray, authors Matthew Reilly and Renée Goossens, and rock icon Angry Anderson AM.

Reilly, author of the best-selling thriller Ice Station said. "For any writer, it all starts at your local library. Chatswood Library on The Concourse offers the next generation of Willoughby-born writers an opportunity to work in a marvellous state-of-the-art facility – right on their own doorstep."

T.S. Eliot award-winning poet Les Murray said "As a supporter and user of the Willoughby Library, I am greatly impressed by the increased size of the new library…private study rooms, meeting rooms, state-of-the-art IT facilities and lovely sunny and shaded spaces for quiet reading… the new library will be a great match for the many enthusiastic visitors it receives."

The library was complete and open in readiness for the National Year of Reading 2012 in Australia.

Productions

The Ensemble Theatre has staged productions at The Concourse.  In 2014, artistic director Sandra Bates mounted performances of all three plays in David Williamson's Jack Manning Trilogy  – Face to Face, A Conversation, and Charitable Intent – back-to-back.  In 2016, in her final directorial role, Bates reunited with Todd McKenney and Nancye Hayes for a reprise of their 2006 production of Six Dance Lessons in Six Weeks, which became the most successful production in the Ensemble's 58-year history.

References
 Notes

 Sources
Time Out
Berkshire Review
Opera Insider

External links
Gov NSW
Francis-Jones Morehen Thorp (FJMT) – architects of the project
Matthew Reilly
Klik Systems
Sydney Festival
A List Guide - Venues
AW Edwards - Projects
Live Guide
Libraries of Sydney Blog

 Buildings and structures in Sydney
 Theatres in Sydney
 Music venues in Sydney
 Theatres completed in 2011
 Chatswood, New South Wales
2011 establishments in Australia